Maxie is a 1954 Austrian comedy drama film directed by Eduard von Borsody, and starring Willy Fritsch, Cornell Borchers, and Fita Benkhoff. The film's sets were designed by the art director Julius von Borsody.

Cast
 Willy Fritsch as Direktor Walter Rhomberg
 Cornell Borchers as Nora, seine Frau
 Fita Benkhoff as Irene, beider Freundin
 Paul Henckels as Schuster Timm
 Hubert von Meyerinck as Felix, Diener
 Sabine Eggerth as Maxi
 Viktor Braun
 Anita Coletta
 Peter Feldt as Anton
 Wolfgang Hebenstreit
 Melanie Horeschowsky as Frau Timm
 Karl Hruschka
 Michael Janisch
 Editha Jarno
 Josef Krastel
 Heli Lichten
 Karl Skraup as Herr Lorenz
 Loni von Friedl
 Olga von Togni
 Herbert Winopal

References

Bibliography 
 Bock, Hans-Michael & Bergfelder, Tim. The Concise CineGraph. Encyclopedia of German Cinema. Berghahn Books, 2009.

External links 
 

1954 films
Austrian comedy-drama films
1954 comedy-drama films
1950s German-language films
Films directed by Eduard von Borsody
Austrian black-and-white films